Frank Stolz (20 July 1844 – 19 November 1926) was a private in the United States Army who was awarded the Medal of Honor for gallantry during the American Civil War. He was awarded the medal on 9 July 1894 for actions performed during the Battle of Vicksburg in 1863.

Personal life 
Stolz was born in Dearborn County, Indiana on 20 July 1844. He married Anna Wagner in 1870 and fathered 3 children. He died on 19 November 1926 in Center Township, Indiana and was buried in Holy Cross and Saint Joseph Cemetery in Indianapolis.

Military service 
Stolz enlisted in the Army as a private in Sunman, Indiana on 17 August 1862. He was assigned to G Company of the 83rd Indiana Infantry. On 22 May 1863, at the Battle of Vicksburg, Stolz was a member of a volunteer storming party attacking Confederate lines near the town. For this action, he was awarded the Medal of Honor with the citation:

Stolz was mustered out of service on 2 June 1865 in Washington D.C. His Medal of Honor is attributed to Indiana.

References

External links

1844 births
1926 deaths
People from Dearborn County, Indiana
United States Army Medal of Honor recipients
American Civil War recipients of the Medal of Honor
Union Army soldiers
People of Indiana in the American Civil War